Daniel Marques Silva (born July 11, 1983 in Jaú), or simply Daniel Marques, is a Brazilian football central defender, who plays for Resende.

Career
Daniel Marques started his professional career with Ituano in 2003, his spell with Ituano was short lived as he left to join Palmeiras in 2003. He remained a Palmeiras player until 2005, during his time there he was part of the 2003 Campeonato Brasileiro Série B winning squad. Although, his spell with Palmeiras was littered with loan spells to four different clubs. First came a move to former club Ituano, then loans to América, Cianorte and Paraná (with whom he made 38 appearances and scored twice) followed. 2006 saw unsuccessful moves to Internacional and Atlético Mineiro (2006 Série B winners) before Daniel Marques joined most recent loan club Paraná on a full-time basis, this time around he made 24 appearances without scoring for the Curitiba-based club.

He moved to Barueri next where he remained for two seasons, he participated in 41 matches and scored two goals. Atlético Goianiense became Daniel Marques' ninth different club in 2010, he played a part in 20 matches for the club. A short spell with Mirassol followed before a move back to Barueri in 2011. Next came his most successful period at a club to date when he signed for Ceará, he made over 50 appearances and scored five times for the club over two seasons before departing to join São Bernardo. After seven appearances for São Bernardo, he agreed to join CRB where he played ten times before leaving to go to Treze until returning to CRB in months later. On 15 December 2015, it was announced that he would join URT.

Honours
Ituano
Campeonato Brasileiro Série C (1): 2003

Palmeiras
Campeonato Brasileiro Série B (1): 2003

Paraná
Campeonato Paranaense (1): 2006

Atlético Mineiro
Campeonato Brasileiro Série B (1): 2006

Barueri
Campeonato Paulista do Interior (1): 2008

Atlético Goianiense
Campeonato Goiano (1): 2010

Ceará
Campeonato Cearense (2): 2011, 2012

São Bernardo
Copa Paulista (1): 2013

CRB
Campeonato Alagoano (2): 2013, 2015

References

External links

Daniel Marques at CBF 
Daniel Marques at Placar 

1983 births
Living people
Footballers from São Paulo (state)
Brazilian footballers
Association football defenders
Campeonato Brasileiro Série A players
Campeonato Brasileiro Série B players
Campeonato Brasileiro Série C players
Ituano FC players
Sociedade Esportiva Palmeiras players
América Futebol Clube (SP) players
Cianorte Futebol Clube players
Paraná Clube players
Sport Club Internacional players
Clube Atlético Mineiro players
Grêmio Barueri Futebol players
Atlético Clube Goianiense players
Mirassol Futebol Clube players
Ceará Sporting Club players
São Bernardo Futebol Clube players
Clube de Regatas Brasil players
Treze Futebol Clube players
União Recreativa dos Trabalhadores players
Resende Futebol Clube players
People from Jaú